Yawa Yawa (Aymara yawa a spear without iron, the reduplication indicates that there is a group or a complex of something, "a complex of spears", also spelled Yagua Yagua) is a mountain  northeast of the Apolobamba mountain range at the border of Bolivia and Peru. On the Bolivian side it is located in the La Paz Department, Franz Tamayo Province, Pelechuco Municipality, and on the Peruvian side it lies in the Puno Region, Putina Province, Sina District. Yawa Yawa is situated south of the mountain Ch'amakani and northeast of Punta Yawri. Yawa Yawa is also the name of a little lake near the mountain.

References 

Mountains of La Paz Department (Bolivia)
Mountains of Puno Region
International mountains of South America
Bolivia–Peru border
Mountains of Peru